Vegardfjella is a mountain in Oscar II Land at Spitsbergen, Svalbard. It is located between the glaciers of Vegardbreen and Charlesbreen, and its highest peak is Larstoppen with a height of 859 m.a.s.l. The mountain is named after Norwegian physicist Lars Vegard.

References

Mountains of Spitsbergen